Charukesi (pronounced chārukēś‌i) is a rāga in Carnatic music (musical scale of South Indian classical music). It is the 26th Melakarta rāgam in the 72 melakarta rāgam system of Carnatic music. It is called Tarangini in Muthuswami Dikshitar school of Carnatic music.

Charukesi is known to incite feelings of pathos and devotion in the listener.

Structure and Lakshana 

It is the 2nd rāgam in the 5th chakra Bana. The mnemonic name is Bana-Sri. The mnemonic phrase is sa ri gu ma pa dha ni. Its  structure (ascending and descending scale) is as follows (see swaras in Carnatic music for details on below notation and terms):
: 
: 
(chathusruthi rishabham, anthara gandharam, shuddha madhyamam, shuddha dhaivatham, kaisiki nishadham)

It is a sampoorna rāgam - a rāgam that has all seven swaras (notes). It is the shuddha madhyamam equivalent of Rishabhapriya, which is the 62nd melakarta.

Janya rāgams 
There are only a few minor janya rāgams (derived scales) associated with Charukesi. See full list of janya rāgams associated with it.

Popular compositions 
Adamodi Galade by Thyagaraja
Karunai Varuumo by Papanasam Sivan 
Kripaya pālaya saure by Swati Tirunal
Innum En manam By Lalgudi Jayaraman 
Palayamam Parameswari, Maye tvam yahi By  Muthuswami Dikshadar 
Samanyavalla Srihariya Seve By Purandara Dasa
Neere Torele by Vadiraja Tirtha
Karunanidhan By Swati Tirunal

Many compositions exist amongst modern adaptations of Charukesi, especially in Indian movies, in film songs. Examples are the songs
Ammamma kelladi thozhi from Karuppu panam by M.S.Viswanathan Dhaandiya Aattam from the movie Kadhalar Dhinam, Vasanta mullai poalae from the movie Sarangadara, Edho Edho Ondru from the movie Enakku Iruvathu, Unakku Padhinettu, 'Aadal Kalaye' from Sri Raghavendra and Udaya Udaya from another Udhaya. In Hindi movies Ahista Ahista from the movie Swades, Teri Umeed Tera Intezar from the movie Deewana, Aye Kash Kavi Aisa Hota from the movie Mohra, are in Charukesi. Another composition in this raaga is the song Bombe Aatavaiyya from the Rajkumar starrer Kannada movie Shruthi Seridaaga. Arguably the best rendition of Charukesi in a Hindi movie is Baiyya Na Dharo sung by Lata Mangeshkar and composed by Madan Mohan from the movie Dastak.  Charukesi is also popular in Hindustani music.

Bhavgeet He Surano Chandra Vha composed by Pandit Jitendra Abhisheki and ghazal Main Hosh Mein Tha performed by Mehdi Hassan are other well known examples of Charukesi.

In Malayalam, one of the all-time greatest songs is in Charukesi: 'Akale akale neelaakaasam' (from the movie 'Midumidukki', 1968). This was composed by Baburaj and sung by Yesudas and S. Janaki. There are claims that this raga is actually a very rare janya raga of Charukesi, Ushaabharanam (s g m d p m d n s / s n d p m g r g m r s). There are other great Charukesi compositions in Malayalam Films like Krishna Kripa Saagaram from Sargam sung by Yesudas and Chitra. Yaathrayai from Aayiram Para by Yesudas, Pooja Bimbam Mizhi from Harikrishnans by Yesudas and Chitra and Swapnam Thejichal from Rakshasa Raajavau by Yesudas to mention a few.

In the 2012 release of his devotional album on Lord Ayyappan Sabarimalai Va Charanam Solli Va, ace singer P. Unni Krishnan renders a song on Raga Charukesi, Uthirathil Udhithavane Sol, signifying the Lord's birth star UTHIRAM. This album was composed and released by Manachanallur Giridharan, a noted music director from Tamil Nadu.

In western music, charukesi like structures are encountered in Franz Schubert's famous Impromptu C Minor Allegro molto moderato and also in Russian Composer Mikhail Ippolitov-Ivanov's 'Procession of the Sardar' from his Orchestral Suite, Caucasian Sketches.

Film Songs

Language:Tamil

Non Film Songs

Related rāgams 
This section covers the theoretical and scientific aspect of this rāgam.

Charukesi's notes when shifted using Graha bhedam, yields 3 other major melakarta rāgams, namely, Vachaspati, Natakapriya and Gourimanohari. Graha bhedam is the step taken in keeping the relative note frequencies same, while shifting the shadjam to the next note in the rāgam. For further details and an illustration, see Graha bhedam on Vachaspati.

Notes

References

External links 
 Film Songs (Hindi) in Charukesi

Melakarta ragas